Mindful Scientific Inc. is a private company based in Halifax, Nova Scotia. The firm holds the exclusive license to develop the Halifax Consciousness Scanner, a portable medical device prototyped by Dr. Ryan C.N. D’Arcy and Dr. Don Weaver in 2009. Mr. Ying Tam is Mindful Scientific’s current CEO.

Mindful Scientific has received numerous awards, including The Wall St. Journal’s 2015 Global Startup of the Year.

References

Companies based in Halifax, Nova Scotia
Medical technology companies of Canada